The Northern Railway (NR) is one of the 19 Railway zones of India and the northernmost zone of the Indian Railways. It is headquartered at Baroda House in New Delhi.

History 

Officially notified as a new railway zone on 14 April 1952, its origin goes back to 3 March 1859.

On 14 April 1952, the Northern Railway zone was created by merging Jodhpur Railway, Bikaner Railway, Eastern Punjab Railway and three divisions of the East Indian Railway north-west of Mughalsarai (Uttar Pradesh).

On 3 March 1859, Allahabad–Kanpur, the first passenger railway line in North India was opened, which falls under Northern Railway zone.

In 1864, a broad-gauge track from Calcutta to Delhi was laid.

In 1864, the railway line between Old Delhi and Meerut City railway station was constructed. Meerut Cantt railway station was established by British India government around 1865 after the sepoy mutiny of 1857.

In 1866, through trains started running on the East Indian Railway Company's Howrah–Delhi line.
 

In 1872, Delhi Sarai Rohilla railway station was established when the metre-gauge railway line from Delhi to Jaipur and Ajmer was being laid. It was a small station just outside Delhi as Delhi was confined to walled city then. All the metre-gauge trains starting from (and terminating at) Delhi to Rewari, Punjab, Rajasthan and Gujarat passed through this station. The track from Delhi to Sarai Rohilla was double. The single track from Sarai Rohilla to Rewari was doubled up to Rewari, from where single tracks diverged in five directions.

In 1876, metre-gauge track from Delhi to Rewari and further to Ajmer was laid in 1873 by Rajputana State Railway.

In 1879, the Sind, Punjab and Delhi railway completed the  Amritsar–Ambala–Saharanpur–Ghaziabad line connecting Multan (now in Pakistan) with Delhi.

In 1884, the Rajputana–Malwa Railway extended the -wide metre gauge Delhi–Rewari line to Bathinda. The Bathinda–Rewari metre-gauge line was converted to  broad gauge in 1994.

On 9 March 1885, the first train ran from Jodhpur Junction railway station to Luni. The New Jodhpur Railway was later combined with Bikaner Railway to form Jodhpur–Bikaner Railway in 1889. A Railway line was completed between Jodhpur and Bikaner in 1891. Later in 1900, it combined with Jodhpur–Hyderabad Railway (some part of this railway is in Pakistan) leading to connection with Hyderabad of Sindh Province. Later in 1924 Jodhpur and Bikaner Railways worked as independent Railways. After Independence, a part of Jodhpur Railway went to West Pakistan.

In 1891, the Delhi–Panipat–Ambala–Kalka line was opened.

In 1891, the Delhi–Panipat–Ambala–Kalka line was opened The -wide narrow-gauge Kalka–Shimla Railway was constructed by Delhi–Panipat–Ambala–Kalka Railway Company and opened for traffic in 1903. In 1905 the line was regauged to -wide narrow gauge.

In 1897, the Southern Punjab Railway Co. opened the Delhi–Bhatinda–Samasatta line in 1897. The line passed through Muktasar and Fazilka tehsils and provided direct connection through Samma Satta (now in Pakistan) to Karachi.

In 1900, the present building of the Delhi Junction railway station was built with 2 platforms and opened for public in 1903.

In 1900, the –Moradabad link was established by Oudh and Rohilkhand Railway.
In 1901–02, the metre gauge Jodhpur–Bikaner line was extended to Bathinda by Jodhpur–Bikaner Railway. It was subsequently converted to broad gauge.

In 1904 the Agra–Delhi line was opened. Six railway lines then entered Delhi. East Indian Railway, North-Western Railway, and Oudh and Rohilkhand Railway entered from  crossing the Yamuna river. Delhi Railway Station was built in red stone to give the effect of nearby historic Red Fort. The station building had six clock towers and tower 4 is still in use as a water tank. The station was remodelled in 1934–35, when its platforms were extended and power signals were introduced. A new entrance from Kashmere Gate side was created in 1990s and new platforms were added. The platforms were renumbered in September 2011. The numbers that started from Kashmere Gate entrance as 1A and ended at 18 near the main entrance were renumbered starting as 1 from the main entrance and ending at 16 at Kashmere Gate entrance and some platforms were merged to form long platforms to accommodate trains of 24 coaches. The station building was renovated in 2012–13. Delhi earlier handled both broad and meter gauge trains. Since 1994, it is a purely broad-gauge station, metre-gauge traffic having been shifted to Delhi Sarai Rohilla station.

In 1926, New Delhi railway station opened ahead of the inauguration of the New Delhi as city in 1931. Agra–Delhi railway track cut through the site earmarked for the hexagonal War Memorial (now called India Gate) and Kingsway (now called Rajpath). East Indian Railway Company shifted the line along the Yamuna river and opened the new track in 1924. Before the new imperial capital New Delhi was established after 1911, the Old Delhi railway station served the entire city and the Agra–Delhi railway line cut through what is today called Lutyens' Delhi and the site earmarked for the hexagonal All-India War Memorial (now India Gate) and Kingsway (now Rajpath). The railway line was shifted along Yamuna river and opened in 1924 to make way for the new capital. Minto (now Shivaji) and Hardinge (now Tilak) rail bridges came up for this realigned line. The East Indian Railway Company, that overlooked railways in the region, sanctioned the construction of a single story building and a single platform between Ajmeri Gate and Paharganj in 1926. This was later known as New Delhi Railway station. The government's plans to have the new station built inside the Central Park of Connaught Place was rejected by the Railways as it found the idea impractical. The Viceroy and royal retinue entered the city through the new railway station during the inauguration of New Delhi in 1931. New structures were added to the railway station later and the original building served as the parcel office for many years.

In 1975–76, the Tundla–Aligarh–Ghaziabad track was electrified.

In 1976–77, the Ghaziabad–Nizamuddin–New Delhi–Delhi track was electrified.

On 1 July 1987, Ambala railway division was created by transferring 639 km tracks from Delhi Division and 348 km from Firozpur Division, and it became completely operational from 15 August 1988. 62% its are lies Punjab and the rest in Haryana, Himachal Pradesh, Uttar Pradesh, Rajasthan and Chandigarh. It has 141 stations, including UNESCO World Heritage Kalka Shimla Railway.

In 1992–1995, Sabjimandi–Panipat–Karnal sector was electrified.

In 1994 December, the Delhi–Rewari railway line had double metre-gauge tracks and one of the tracks was converted to broad gauge as a part of conversion of Ajmer–Delhi line. Within a few years, both the tracks from Sarai Rohilla to Delhi railway station were converted to broad gauge and all metre gauge trains stopped operating from Delhi station.

In 1998–99, Ambala–Chandigarh sector was electrified.

In 1999–2000, Chandigarh–Kalka.

In 2003, Anand Vihar Terminal railway station's was announced as new station to be built, foundation stone laid on 25 January 2004. construction commenced in October 2006, and opened on 20 October 2009. The city of Delhi heavily depends on the Rail transport to cater for the increasing load of passengers to their destinations. The long-distance trains from Delhi used to ply from three stations namely  (Old Delhi),  and Hazrat Nizamuddin railway stations. These stations lacked the infrastructure facilities to handle such high passenger rush. Also, Delhi is the connecting station for the cities in the Northern states Punjab, Haryana, Himachal Pradesh, Uttarakhand and Jammu and Kashmir. With increasing passenger pressure at the existing stations, the requirement of additional major passenger terminals was identified by the Northern Railways. The East-bound trains from Delhi to the states of Uttar Pradesh, Bihar, Orissa, Jharkhand West Bengal and other North-eastern states had to cross the bridge over River Yamuna as all the three stations are located on the other side of the river. Thus, the area of Anand Vihar was selected in the trans-Yamuna region to construct a mega-railway terminal. 
 
In 2010–11 Rail Budget, Panipat–Meerut line 104 km survey was announced and the project implementation was approved in 2017–18 budget with an outlay of 948 crore.

In 2013, Chandigarh–Sahnewal line (also referred to as Ludhiana–Chandigarh rail link) was inaugurated.

In 2013, the foundation stone for the shifting of Rohtak–Makrauli section of Rohtak–Gohana–Panipat line was laid.

By September 2006, the second metre-gauge track from Sarai Rohilla to Rewari was also converted to broad gauge and all metre-gauge trains stopped operating between Rewari and Sarai Rohilla (though the converted track was opened for public use only in October 2007).

In 2015 to 2016, work of doubling of Ghaziabad–Meerut–Khatauli (Muzaffarnagar) section of Meerut––Saharanpur tracks was completed

In January 2016, the  Ghaziabad–Moradabad line was completely electrified. The Ghaziabad–Meerut–Muzaffarnagar–Saharanpur–Roorkee–Haridwar line is also open to electric trains with effect from March 2016.

In 2016, Vivaan Solar, a Gwalior-based company won the contract to install 2.2 MW of rooftop solar project at the Delhi Junction railway station in late 2016. The solar power project to be set up under public–private partnership will be executed on design, build, finance, operate and transfer (DBFOT) basis. The company will also be responsible for maintenance of the plant for a period of 25 years.

In 2016–17 Rail Budget, Yamunanagar–Chandigarh line re-survey for this 875 crore line was announced at the cost of 25 crore.

In 2017–18, Indian Railway approved Panipat–Jind line and Panipat–Rohtak line electrification for 980 crore and new rail line Panipat–Shamli–Baghpat–Meerut for 2200 crore.

In 2017 December, National Capital Region Transport Corporation signed agreements with Administrador de Infraestructuras Ferroviarias (Spain's state owned company) and Société nationale des chemins de fer français (France's state owned company) to cooperate on the development of rapid rail smart projects, including Delhi–Meerut Smart Line, Delhi–Panipat Smart Line and Delhi–Alwar Smart Line have been prioritised for implementation in the first phase of NCR RRTS where these three lines will operate from Sarai Kale Khan in Delhi. Designed with 180 km/h design speed, 160 km/h operational speed, and 100 km/h average speed, of six-car trains carrying 1,154 passengers running every 5 to 10 minutes on either underground or elevated point-to-point tracks where passengers will not have to change trains. 35-40% funding will be equity from Centre and state governments and the remaining 60% will come from multilateral funding agencies. In 2017 December, National Capital Region Transport Corporation signed agreements with Administrador de Infraestructuras Ferroviarias (Spain's state owned company) and Société nationale des chemins de fer français (France's state owned company) to cooperate on the development of rapid rail smart projects, including Delhi–Meerut Smart Line, Delhi–Panipat Smart Line and Delhi–Alwar Smart Line have been prioritised for implementation in the first phase of NCR RRTS where these three lines will operate from Sarai Kale Khan in Delhi. NCRTC has commissioned a traffic pattern study by the Delhi Integrated Multi-Modal Transit System (DIMTS) that will determine rote and the design of stations depending on the traffic. 32,598 crore Delhi–Ghaziabad–Meerut RRTS will be implemented first, ground clearance is underway in December 2017, construction will commence by June 2018 and completed by 2024, for which pre-construction activities including geo-technical investigations, detailed design, utility-shifting planning and traffic diversion planning are in progress. 30,000 crore Delhi–Panipat Smart Line and 180.5 km will cost around 37,539 crore Delhi–Alwar Smart Line are awaiting DPR approval, construction to commence by the end of 2018 and completed before 2025. Delhi–Alwar line will have 19 stations, 9 underground stations from ISBT Kashmere Gate to Kherki Daula and 10 elevated stations on 124.5 km route.

By December 2017, railways for the first time installed 6,095 GPS-enabled "Fog Pilot Assistance System" railway signalling devices in four most affected zones, Northern Railway zone, North Central Railway zone, North Eastern Railway zone and North Western Railway zone, by doing away with the old practice of putting firecrackers on train tracks to alert train divers running trains on snail's pace. With these devices, train pilots precisely know in advance, about the location of signals, level-crossing gates and other such approaching markers.

Divisions
The Zonal Headquarters Office of Northern Railways is at Baroda House, New Delhi, and five divisional headquarters are located at:
 Ambala railway division at Ambala (Haryana), 
 Delhi railway division at Delhi, 
 Firozpur railway division at Firozpur (Punjab), 
 Lucknow NR railway division at Lucknow (Uttar Pradesh) and
 Moradabad railway division at Moradabad (Western Uttar Pradesh).

The first passenger railway line in North India opened from Allahabad to Kanpur on 3 March 1859. This was followed in 1889, by the Delhi–Panipat–Ambala–Kalka line. Northern Railways previously consisted of eight divisional zones: Allahabad, Bikaner, Jodhpur, Delhi, Moradabad, Ferozpur, Ambala, and Lucknow, spanning most of North India. With the re-organisation of zones by the Indian Railways, Northern Railway zone came to its present form on 14 April 1952 and it now consists of five divisional zones.

Major stations in Northern Railway Zone 
Below is a list of the breakup of stations by category.

Infrastructure 
On 19 February 1986, Northern Railways was the first zone to introduce the computerized passenger reservation system and was the first zone to do so. To facilitate the Unreserved travellers to also plan their journey ahead, Northern Railway introduced the Unreserved Ticketing System (UTS) whereby the unreserved rail passenger can purchase an unreserved ticket three days in advance from the current booking counters.

The first diesel and electric locomotive simulators in India at the Tughlakabad and Kanpur locomotive sheds were introduced by Northern Railways. These help upgrading the skills of the working and new drivers, providing them training for high-speed train operation. All workshops, diesel sheds and air brake freight departments are ISO 9000 certified. Diesel shed, Tughlaqabad has the distinction of being the first diesel shed to get ISO 14000 certification on the Indian Railway.

There are eight workshops operated by Northern Railways

Zonal Railway Training Institute (ZRTI) at Chandausi, Moradabad UP is the oldest (and North India's only) Railway Training Institute, where group C railway employees like Driver, Guard, Ticket Checker, Station Master, Traffic Inspector, Commercial Inspector, JE (signal & Telecom) etc. are trained for initial, promotional and refresher courses. ZRTI is an ISO 9001 Institute. Applicants pass All India Railway Examinations to get admission into the institute. ZRTI is headed by a senior Civil Services Officer.

Routes

Express

Jurisdiction 
Northern Railways is one of nine old zones of Indian Railways and also the biggest in terms of network having 6807 kilometre route. It covers the states of Punjab, Haryana, Himachal Pradesh, Uttarakhand and Uttar Pradesh and the Union territories of Jammu and Kashmir, Delhi and Chandigarh.

Background 

Northern Railways implemented the route relay interlocking (RRI) system at New Delhi railway station which is a modern signaling system for enhancing efficiency and safety in the operations. This RRI system at New Delhi is one of the world's largest route relay interlocking system certified by the Guinness Book of Records. Northern Railway is equipped with 40 RRI systems including the system at Delhi Main.

Delhi Suburban Railway services is a commuter rail service operated by Northern Railway. It covers the city state of Delhi, along with the adjoining districts of Faridabad, Ghaziabad and other adjoining places in Haryana and Uttar Pradesh. These services are mostly run using EMU and MEMU rakes. In 2009 Ladies Special trains were introduced between New Delhi and Palwal. Two more ladies special trains will be connecting from the city to Ghaziabad and Panipat.

Starting with a part of Firozpur division of the Northern Railway zone, the line has been under construction since 1983; the Jammu–Udhampur–Srinagar–Baramulla Railway Link (JUSBRL) of the Jammu–Baramulla line is under construction in perhaps the most difficult terrain on the Indian subcontinent. The Northern Railway reached another landmark achievement by extending rail services in the Kashmir Valley on 28 October 2009 by commencing rail services between Anantnag and Qazigund of the Qazigund-Baramula rail project. Pir Panjal Railway Tunnel, the 10.96 km long railway tunnel, passes through the Pir Panjal Range of middle Himalayas in Jammu and Kashmir. It is a part of its Udhampur–Srinagar–Baramulla rail link project, opened in October 2011, India's longest and Asia's second longest railway tunnel and reduced the distance between Quazigund and Banihal to only 11 km .

The Public Private Partnership to install rooftop solar project was signed in late 2016. The solar power project is to be executed on design, build, finance, operate and transfer (DBFOT) basis and expected to be operational by August 2017. The company will also be responsible for maintaining the respective solar power plants with break up of 1.1 MW, 1.1 MW, 2.2 MW, and 0.6 MW respectively for a period of 25 years.

Loco sheds
 Electric Loco Shed, Ghaziabad
 Electric Loco Shed, Ludhiana
 Electric Loco Shed, Saharanpur
 Electric Loco Shed, Khanalampura
 Diesel Loco Shed, Tughlakabad
 Diesel Loco Shed, Ludhiana
 Diesel Loco Shed, Lucknow
 Diesel Loco Shed, Roza
 Diesel Loco Shed, Alambagh

See also

 All India Station Masters' Association (AISMA)
 Zones and divisions of Indian Railways
 New Delhi railway station
 Delhi Junction railway station
 Delhi Sarai Rohilla railway station
 Lucknow NR

References

External links
 Northern Railway, Official website
 Indian Railway, Official website

Zones of Indian Railways
 
1952 establishments in India